Acacia trachycarpa, commonly known as minni ritchi, curly-bark tree,  sweet-scented minni ritchi or Pilbara minni ritchi, is a shrub or tree belonging to the genus Acacia and the subgenus Juliflorae that is native to arid and semi-arid areas of Western Australia.

Description
The crown is often spreading but sometimes flat-topped. The bark is a burgundy red to reddish-brown colour which peels off the trunk and branches in thin strips that curl backward. The dull green phyllodes are normally soft and delicate and can be straight or shallowly curved or wavy. They have three or more parallel longitudinal nerves per face but normally only the central nerve is apparent. The apex narrows to a fine and pungent point. It blooms from April to October producing yellow flowers. The seed pods that form later have a narrowly oblong to linear shape. the pods are flat with straight sides with little constriction between seeds. The seeds within are arranged obliquely and have a spherical to obloid shape.

Taxonomy
The species was first formally described in 1904 by the botanist Ernst Georg Pritzel as part of the work between Pritzel and Ludwig Diels Fragmenta Phytographiae Australiae occidentalis. Beitrage zur Kenntnis der Pflanzen Westaustraliens, ihrer Verbreitung und ihrer Lebensverhaltnisse as published in Botanische Jahrbücher für Systematik, Pflanzengeschichte und Pflanzengeographie. It was reclassified as Racosperma trachycarpum in 2003 by Leslie Pedley then transferred back to the genus Acacia in 2006. The only other synonym is Acacia gonocarpa var. lasiocalyx.
The specific epithet is taken from the Greek word trachys meaning rough and carpos meaning fruit in reference to rough texture of the seed pods.

Distribution
It is endemic to an area in the Kimberley, Goldfields and Pilbara regions of Western Australia where it is usually found along creeks and rivers growing in stony sandy soils. The population is mostly found to the west of the Hamersley Range with the distribution becoming more scattered in the Kimberley region and eastwards toward the border. It will sometimes forming thickets on coastal pindan sandplains in the Pilbara region. It is commonly part of the Acacia pyrifolia and Acacia coriacea subsp. pendens woodland communities on alluvial plains and washes.

Cultivation
The plant is available commercially in seed form or as tube stock seedlings. It is known as a moderately fast growing multi-stemmed shrub or tree that is drought tolerant and grows well in non-saline and well drained soils in a full sun to part shade position. Seeds need to be pretreated with hot water is recommended prior to planting.

See also
List of Acacia species

References

trachycarpa
Acacias of Western Australia
Taxa named by Ernst Pritzel
Plants described in 1904